Lindeman Lake may refer to several places:

 Lindeman Lake (Chilkoot Trail), a lake in northwestern British Columbia
 Lindeman Lake (Chilliwack), a lake in Chilliwack Lake Provincial Park, British Columbia

See also 
 Lindeman